Aidé Mendiola (born 14 November 2000) is a Bolivian footballer who plays as a defender for Mundo Futuro and the Bolivia women's national team. She is also a futsal player.

Early life
Mendiola was raised in the Santa Cruz Department.

Club career
Mendiola has played for Mundo Futuro in Bolivia.

International career
Mendiola made her senior debut for Bolivia on 21 February 2021 in a 0–3 friendly away loss to Ecuador.

References

2000 births
Living people
People from Santa Cruz Department (Bolivia)
Bolivian women's footballers
Women's association football defenders
Bolivia women's international footballers
Bolivian women's futsal players
Futsal players at the 2018 Summer Youth Olympics